In 1999, two New Zealand island soccer leagues were run to replace the National Summer Soccer League which had finished at the end of the 1998 season. The two leagues, one for the North Island (the NISL) and one for the South Island (the SISL) were followed by a play-off between the two champion sides to determine the national champions. The games were mainly played during winter, in direct contrast to the previous summer league.

The format proved to be both controversial and unpopular, and from 2000 a New Zealand National Soccer League returned. Participants in the 2000 league were the top seven teams in the 1999 NISL and the top three teams in the 1999 SISL.

North Island Soccer League

Participants
Twelve teams took part in the NISL. These included five from the northern region (Central United, Melville United, Mount Wellington, North Shore United, and Waitakere City) and two from the central region (Miramar Rangers and Napier City Rovers) which had been participants in the 1998 National Summer Soccer League.

The remaining five teams were promoted from the Northern and Central Leagues (Metro were Northern League champions; Western Suburbs FC, Lower Hutt City, Manawatu AFC, and Wellington Olympic were first, second, fourth, and fifth respectively in the Central League). It is unclear why Waterside Karori, who finished third in the Central League, were not promoted to the NISL.

The composition of the league included five Auckland teams, four Wellington teams, plus one team each from Hamilton, Palmerston North, and Napier.

South Island Soccer League

Participants
Eight teams took part in the SISL. These included one team from the central region (Nelson Suburbs) which had been participants in the 1998 National Summer Soccer League, and the teams which finished in the top six places in the Southern League in 1998 (Dunedin Technical, Christchurch Technical, Southland United, Northern Hearts, Woolston WMC, and Caversham). The sixth team was a new composite team, Marlborough.

The composition of the league included two teams from Christchurch, two from Dunedin, and one each from Nelson, Timaru, Blenheim, and Invercargill.

National Final

References

1
New Zealand